Chris Summers (born July 10, 1989) is an American football wide receiver who is currently a free agent. He played college football at Liberty University. He signed with the Chicago Bears as an undrafted free agent in 2012.

Professional career

Chicago Bears
On April 29, 2012, he signed with the Chicago Bears as an undrafted free agent. On August 26, he was released.

Minnesota Vikings
On September 3, 2012, he signed with the Minnesota Vikings. On January 7, 2013, he was signed to a reserve/future contract.  Summers was released by the Vikings on August 26, 2013 (along with 12 others) to get to a 75-man roster.

Buffalo Bills
Summers signed with the Buffalo Bills during the 2014 offseason, but was released on August 25, 2014.

Arizona Rattlers
Summers joined the Arizona Rattlers in 2015. On May 3, 2016, Summers was placed on reassignment.

References

External links
Liberty bio
Minnesota Vikings bio

Living people
1989 births
Liberty Flames football players
Minnesota Vikings players
Los Angeles Kiss players
Jacksonville Sharks players
Arizona Rattlers players